Yongbieocheonga, literally Songs of the Dragons Flying to Heaven, was the first work written in Hangul. The book was published in 1447 and written by Jeong Inji (정인지, 鄭麟趾), An Ji (안지, 安止), and Kwon Jae (권제, 權踶). The preface was written by Seong Sam-mun (성삼문, 成三問) and Pak Paengnyeon (박팽년, 朴彭年). 

The book was written on the Joseon dynasty and its ancestral heritage. Today, the Songs provide insight into the development of Joseon, the Korean people, and the history of neighboring ethnicities in Northeast Asia such as the Jurchens (Manchus) who would later establish the Qing dynasty of China.

The songs, in the form of 125 cantos, were composed through the efforts of a committee of Confucian philologists and literati. This compilation was the first Korean writing to be recorded in hangul (in addition to hanja). Previously, Korea had a long history of recording texts using Chinese characters exclusively. Several important themes in addition to that of the establishment of the Joseon dynasty reflect the events that gave rise to the creation of these poems: historical events that took place in China, the apotheosis of virtuous Kings preceding the fall of the Goryeo dynasty in Korea, and the Confucian political and philosophical ideologies. On April 28, 2006, it was designated as Korean Treasure No. 1463.

Historical background
In 1259, a peace treaty was signed between the Goryeo Wang family kings and the Mongol Empire, resulting in a one hundred-year period of political domination by the Mongol-led Yuan dynasty of China. The period saw the increasing influence of Confucianism alongside the traditions of Buddhism, which had been the national religion for nearly eight hundred years. 

During this period, the Yuan ʼPhags-pa script was in use alongside Chinese characters as one of the official scripts of the Mongol empire and would ultimately be one of the influences for the Korean Hangul alphabet. Near the end of the Yuan dynasty, in 1362 the old Korean capital Kaesong was captured from the Red Turbans. In 1382, the Chinese and Koreans defeated Japanese pirates at Mt. Hwangsan. 

In 1388, some Koreans allied with the Ming dynasty, with some Korean generals refusing to march to Liaodong Peninsula to capture Ming strongholds for the Yuan. One of the Korean generals, Yi Seong-gye executed Goryeo’s last minister Jeong Mong-ju in 1392 and exiled Goryeo's last king. Not long after this, Yi Seong-gye became the founder of the Joseon dynasty of Korea, which succeeded the previous Goryeo dynasty and was closely aligned with the Ming dynasty. 

In 1418 during the Joseon era, Korea began to experience a significant shift in academics and Confucian philosophical ideologies. In 1420, the Academy of Worthies was established, and their scholars were primarily responsible for the further spread of Confucianism through Korea, the creation of hangul, and a number of literary works including the Songs of the Dragons Flying to Heaven.

Implications of the Songs
The dragons spoken of in the title the Songs represent the six ancestors of the Joseon dynasty: Mokjo, Ikjo, Dojo, Hwanjo, Taejo, and Taejong. The flight of the dragons, Yongbieocheonga is the Joseon dynasty's rise in accordance with the Chinese concept of "the Mandate of Heaven." This identifies the Joseon ancestry as morally and politically virtuous and also sets out an ideological foundation for future Joseon rulers to follow.

See also

Hunmin jeongeum
Korean literature
Korean poetry

References

External links
 Brief information about Yongbieocheonga at Cultural Heritage Administration of South Korea
  The complete texts and analysis on Yongbieocheonga
  The complete texts of Yongbieocheonga in Ancient and Modern Korean
  Yongbieocheonga in hanja (Chinese characters), from Sejong's history (世宗荘憲大王実録) volume 147

Joseon dynasty works
Hangul
Korean poetry